The Russian Beach Soccer Championships are the main national beach soccer championships in Russia. They are performed annually since 2005. Overall, 9 clubs (formerly 16 and 8 clubs) qualified through regional championships participate. They are divided into four groups, each composed of four teams, and two of the best clubs in each team will reach the quarterfinals. The winner is decided after a series of play-off rounds.

Regulations 
Formerly, 16 teams participated in the main round. At times there were qualifying rounds. The number of teams was reduced to 8 in 2011.

A new system was introduced in the 2014 season. Now the eight teams played two legs. There were overall 14 rounds which were split into 3 stages. Each win in regular time was calculated as three points, a win in overtime or after a series of penalties two points, a loss in the overtime or after a series of penalties one point. The four best teams qualified for the quarterfinals, the so-called Superfinal, which was played in the play-off system. In the semifinals and the final there were two wins to be made in each round. The third-place game was played as a single-elimination round. The teams who reached the two worst places were pulled out from this tournament in the next year, and they were to be replaced by the winners of the Russian Cup, the second-highest ranked national tournament.

In the 2015 season, a new system of point calculation was introduced. Now, two points were given for a win in the overtime, one point after a series of penalties and zero points for any loss. Also, overall three sportsmen of a foreign club (a "legionnaire") were allowed to play in a club, two of which may play at one time in a pitch. Furthermore, each club received an opportunity to take a one-minute time out once during a game.

In the 2017 season, overall nine clubs participated, six of which qualified for the Superfinal. The two best teams of the regular season automatically entered the semifinal, while the remaining four teams played in the quarterfinals.

Men's Championships

Tournaments

Team statistics

Women's Championships

Tournaments

Team statistics

References

External links 
  Tournament details on BeachSoccerRussia
  Russian Beach Soccer Federation
  Beachsoccer.ru

Beach soccer in Russia
National beach soccer leagues